NGC 4694 is a lenticular galaxy in the constellation Virgo. It was discovered by William Herschel on March 15, 1784

See also
 List of NGC objects (4001–5000)

Gallery

References

External links
 

Lenticular galaxies
Virgo (constellation)
4694
043241